This is a list of symbolic uses of  "star" ideograms.

Star (classification), a scoring system for hotels, restaurants and movies
Star (football badge), representing trophies won by a football team
Barnstar, a decorative painted object or image often used to adorn a barn
Brunswick star, an eight- or sixteen-pointed star surrounding the British Royal Cypher, used on police badges
Hex sign, a form of Pennsylvania Dutch folk art
Mullet (heraldry), unconventional shapes of stars on coats-of-arms
Nautical star, a popular tattoo design
Red star, a political symbol of communism and socialism
Star of Life, representing emergency medical services units and personnel

Geometry
Star polygon, a star drawn with a number of lines equal to the number of points
Pentagram, a five-pointed star polygon
Five-pointed star, a pentagram with internal line segments removed
Lute of Pythagoras, a pentagram-based fractal pattern
Hexagram, a six-pointed star polygon
Heptagram, a seven-pointed star polygon
Octagram, an eight-pointed star polygon
Enneagram, a nine-pointed star polygon
Decagram, a ten-pointed star polygon
Hendecagram, an eleven-pointed star polygon
Dodecagram, a twelve-pointed star polygon
Magic star, a star polygon in which numbers can be placed at each of the vertices and intersections, such that the four numbers on each line sum to the same "magic" constant

Typography
Star (glyph), any of a number of star-shaped glyphs in typography
Asterisk, a typographical symbol (*)
Arabic star, a typographical symbol developed to be distinct from the asterisk

Medals and awards
1-, 2-, 3-, 4-, or 5-star rank, officer ranks used in many armed services, as well as the rare 6-star rank.
Africa Star, awarded by the British Commonwealth for service in World War II.
Award star, issued by the United States military for meritorious action in combat.
Bronze Star Medal, a United States Armed Forces individual military decoration.
Gold star, the highest state decoration in the Soviet Union and several post-Soviet states.
Service star, an attachment to a military decoration which denotes participation in military campaigns or multiple bestowals of the same award.
Silver Star, a military decoration which can be awarded to a member of any branch of the United States Armed Forces.
Order of the White Star, an Estonian civilian public service award.
Star Scout, a rank in the Boy Scouts of America.

Religious and supernatural uses
Star of David, or Jewish Star, a hexagram symbolizing Israel, Judeans, and/or Jews; properly speaking, this "star" is called the "Shield of David," (Magen David), while the pentagram is the "Star of David." Note that this is a cultural, rather than religious symbol.
Star of Lakshmi, a Hindu symbol associated with the goddess Lakshmi
Star of Ishtar, an ancient symbol associated with the Mesopotamian goddess Ishtar
Star and crescent, an Islamic symbol
The Star (Tarot card), one of the Major Arcana
Druze star, a symbol of the Druze religion
Marian star, a six-pointed star used as a Roman Catholic symbol of celestial objects
Rub el Hizb, a common Islamic symbol
alQuds Star, a star representing 'alQuds' (Jerusalem)
Haykal, a five-pointed star that represents the Bahá'í Faith
Nine-pointed star, a common symbol of the Bahá'í Faith that represents unity and Bahá’.